"Eritrea, Eritrea, Eritrea" is the national anthem of Eritrea. Adopted in 1993 shortly after independence, it was written by Solomon Tsehaye Beraki and composed by Isaac Abraham Meharezghi and Aron Tekle Tesfatsion.

History 
The lyrics of the anthem were written by poet Solomon Tsehaye Beraki. Originally written in 1986, Solomon updated them in 1993 after Eritrea's independence. The music was composed in 1985–1986 by organist Isaac Abraham Meharezghi (also spelt Isaq), who was a member of the Eritrean People's Liberation Front cultural troupe.

Lyrics

Current lyrics (1993–present)

Original lyrics (1986–1993)

Notes

References

External links
Eritrea: Ertra, Ertra, Ertra - Audio of the national anthem of Eritrea, with information and lyrics (archive link)

African anthems
Eritrean music
National symbols of Eritrea
1986 songs
National anthem compositions in F major